The Anacostia Riverwalk Trail is a multi-use trail system in Washington, DC, which, when complete, will be ~25 miles long, spanning both sides of the Anacostia River, the Washington Channel waterfront, and projecting into neighborhoods away from the Anacostia. It has more recently been branded as part of a larger Anacostia Riverwalk Trail Network which includes an additional 8 segments and 15 miles of trail. On the north end it connects to the Anacostia Tributary Trail System; on the south end it will connect to the Oxon Hill Farm Trail and on the west it connects to the Rock Creek Park Trail and the 14th Street Bridge. Of the 19 planned segments, 14 are complete for a combined total of 16 miles.

History

The Anacostia Riverwalk Trail was first proposed as a 20-mile system of trails in the 2003 Anacostia Waterfront Initiative (AWI) Framework Plan, though similar proposals for such trails had been considered for decades. For example the National Capital Planning Commission's 1997 Extending the Legacy plan proposed an 11 mile "Washington Water Walk" from Georgetown to the National Arboretum and the 1966 federal "Trails for America" report identified a 25 mile trail along the Anacostia as a good candidate for a Washington, DC area trail system. The AWI plan called for building trails on the east side of the Anacostia from the Maryland boundary to the Frederick Douglass Memorial Bridge, on the west side from the Benning Road Bridge to Fort McNair and along the Southwest Waterfront from Buzzard Point to the Tidal Basin. The AWI plan called it the Anacostia Riverwalk and Trail.

Over the next three years, the District government proceeded to study and design the trail system. During that time it was renamed, with the "and" dropped. They identified 19 different trail segments 16 miles in total length, or 25 miles with expanded elements. The system proposed after design was expanded to include segments south to Blue Plains, north to the Capitol and the Tidal Basin, and with a bridge across the Anacostia at the National Arboretum. The design took advantage of several existing pieces of multi-use facilities including the 0.6 mile River Terrace section (repaved and modified in 2003 when the new Ethel Kennedy Bridge was constructed) and a 0.3 mile trail connection to Heritage Island, both built for the bicentennial; the 0.5 mile Navy Yard Promenade built after 1991; a 0.2 mile trail through Southwest Waterfront Park, built in 1968; a 0.2 mile connection over 295 to the Anacostia Recreation Center, originally opened in 1964 and rebuilt in 2009-2010; and 2.7 miles of bicycle/pedestrian facilities on the Sousa (built in 1941, and modified for better bicycle and pedestrian access in 1995), Francis Case (built in 1971, with a causeway built by 1993 and modified in 2018) and Ethel Kennedy (built in 2004) Bridges. However, the Navy Yard Promenade didn't open to the public until April 1, 2011, after the Navy built a fence between it and the facility. Altogether 4.5 miles of trail and facilities existed prior to production of the AWI plan. 

In 2003, the District Department of Transportation defined and signed an interim trail that utilized on-street routes, a few existing sections of trail and some demonstration trails located next to the Earth Conservation Corps's Mathew Henson Center at Half Street, SW and their Pumphouse facility along First Street, SE; and another along Water Street where the Anacostia Community Boathouse used to be. At that time they also repaved a temporary trail from Anacostia Drive to the Douglass Bridge's sidewalks and on to Bolling Air Force Base.

Since the initial groundbreaking in 2007, another 13 miles of trail has been completed and over two miles is under construction as of 2020.

In 2014, the section that passes beneath the 11th Street Bridge on the north side of the river was closed to allow Washington Gas to clean up contaminants related to the former Washington Gas East Station manufactured gas plant property which was just north of the site. Once it was cleaned up the area was seeded with native species and the closure remained in place to allow the vegetation to become established. It was to take only two years, but took six instead and the area wasn't reopened until February 2021.

Description

Because the Riverwalk was built bit by bit, designed and constructed at different times by different organizations, the trail is a varying combination of trails and trail segments. At times it is a paved multi-use trail, an on-road route, a sidewalk, a protected bike lane or a riverfront promenade. Its surface is mostly asphalt, but at times concrete, brick or boardwalk is used. 

On the north end, the trail starts at the southern terminus of the Anacostia Tributary Trail System in Prince George's County just north of the New York Avenue/US-50 Bridge and follows the river south through Kenilworth Park and Aquatic Gardens to the intersection of 40th St. NE and Anacostia Avenue, NE. It then travels over Watts Branch and through the Mayfair neighborhood on road to the intersection of Anacostia Drive, NE and Foote St. NE. There it enters the south portion of Kenilworth Park on an old park service access road where it connects to a multi-use trail between the river and the old PEPCO power plant. It follows this trail to Benning Road where the trail splits to both sides of the river.

On the east side, the trail continues along the river through River Terrace Park, under East Capitol Street, over the railroad tracks and into the main part of Anacostia National Park. In ANP it travels all the way to Poplar Point between the river and Anacostia Drive, SE. At Popular Point it begins to run along the east side of South Capitol Street, connecting to both sides of the Douglass Bridge, before ending at Defense Boulevard and the gate to Joint Base Anacostia Bolling.

On the west side, the trail travels along the river to Douglass Bridge and then across Southwest DC to the Washington Channel, where it turns north. South of Benning Road, it travels along the river on the east side of the RFK parking lots and Congressional Cemetery. It crosses over the railroad tracks, with a separate connection to Barney Circle, and then uses a sidewalk, sections of trail and Water Street, SE to traverse Boathouse Row. After crossing under the 11th Street Bridge, it connects, in order, to the Navy Yard Promenade, Yards Park and Diamond Teague Park. Someday it will connect from there to the Douglass Bridge and Buzzard Point before turning north, but for now, it detours on road on Potomac Avenue, First Street, SW and P Street, SW to Southwest Waterfront Park. From there it turns north along the Washington Channel using the trail in Southwest Waterfront Park, sidewalks and sidepaths along Maine Avenue and the trail in front of the Wharf to its terminus at Ohio Drive and the trails around the Tidal Basin. 

In the future, the trail will connect via two routes to the Capitol, via the South Capital Street Trail to Oxon Cove Park and via a new trail segment in Kenilworth Gardens and a bridge over the Anacostia to the National Arboretum. In 2018, it was branded as part of a larger Anacostia River Trail Network that included the Marvin Gaye Trail, the Suitland Parkway Trail and its extension, the proposed Shepherd's Branch Trail, the proposed Lincoln Connector Trail, the 11th Street Bridge Park, the Oxon Run Trail, and the Pennsylvania Avenue Trail.

See also
Metropolitan Branch Trail

References

External links

Hiking trails in Washington, D.C.
Urban heritage trails
Urban public parks